Suryakant Sawhney, known professionally as Lifafa, is an Indian indie musician. Lifafa came to prominence with his album Jaago.

Discography 
 Jaago (2019)
 SUPERPOWER2020 (2020)
 Ghar: Sounds of Raw Mango (2020)

References

Indian singer-songwriters
Indie musicians
Year of birth missing (living people)
Living people